Sonpur Junction, station code SEE, is a railway station and the headquarters of the Sonpur railway division of East Central Railway. Sonpur Junction is located in Sonpur city in Saran district in the Indian state of Bihar.

History

The work on doubling of tracks on  tracks between Sonpur and Hajipur has been carried on since past few years and is set to be completed by the end of 2012.

Bridge 
In 2009, the construction of India's longest road-cum-rail bridge, the Digha–Sonpur rail–road bridge, was underway on the banks on the Ganges nearby, to connect Patna to Pahleja Ghat. The bridge was completed by end of August 2015.

Infrastructure 
There are 4 platforms at Sonpur Junction. The platforms are interconnected with foot overbridges (FOB). The length of the platforms were increased in 2011 to accommodate 24-coach trains. The major facilities available are Waiting rooms, computerised reservation facility, Vehicle parking. The vehicles are allowed to enter the station premises. The station also has STD/ISD/PCO Telephone booth, toilets, tea stall and book stall. The passenger reservation system, booking counters and unreserved ticketing system are provided with air-conditioning facility.

In October 2016, Railways inaugurated a Happiness Junction at the Sonepur railway station, with an objective to provide books and several other entertainment tools to passengers waiting for trains.

Gallery

Nearest railway stations
The distance from nearby stations are:

Nearest airports
The nearest airports to Sonpur Junction are:
 Lok Nayak Jayaprakash Airport, Patna 
 Gaya Airport 
 Netaji Subhash Chandra Bose International Airport, Kolkata

See also 
 Lichchavi Express

References

External links 
 
 Official website of the Vaishali district

Railway stations in Saran district
Railway junction stations in Bihar
Sonpur railway division